Valluvanad was an independent chiefdom in present-day central Kerala that held power from the early 12th century to the end of the 18th century. Prior to that, and since the late 10th century, Valluvanad existed as an autonomous chiefdom within the kingdom of the Chera Perumals. The disintegration of the Chera Perumal kingdom in early 12th century led to the independence of the various autonomous chiefdoms of the kingdom, Valluvanad being one of them.

The earliest mention of the term "Valluvanad" as a political entity, from the 9th and early 10th century, are references to a region within the Ay kingdom in the south Kerala, then a vassal to the Pandya kingdom. It is possible that the new chiefdom in central Kerala (within the kingdom of the Chera Perumals) derives its origin from this eponymous subdivision in south Kerala. Valluvanad was ruled by a Samanthan Nair clan known as Vellodis, similar to the Eradis of neighbouring Eranad and Nedungadis of Nedunganad. The rulers of Valluvanad were known by the title Valluvakonathiri/Vellattiri.

The geographical bounds of Valluvanad are hard to assess from available sources, and did vary significantly in time. It has been generally described as the region between the knolls of Pandalur Hills (a hill that separates old Eranad Taluk from Valluvanad Taluk, located in Malappuram-Manjeri area) and the seashore of Ponnani. The country covered the Bharathapuzha river basin in the south to the Pandalur Hills in the north. On the west, it was bounded by the Arabian Sea at the port Ponnani and on the east by Attappadi Hills. In the 12th century, Valluvanad had parts of present-day Nilambur (Nilambur-Wandoor-Karuvarakundu-Tuvvur area), Eranad (Pandikkad-Manjeri-Malappuram areas), Tirur (Tirunavaya-Athavanad-Kottakkal-Valanchery areas), and Ponnani Taluks within it, with Ponnani port providing the main access to the sea. At that time a larger part of the basins of Chaliyar and Kadalundi River were ruled by Valluvakonathiri. In its maximal extend, its northern boundary was Thrikkulam at Tirurangadi in Tirurangadi Taluk and southern border was Edathara near Palakkad. A larger portion of what is presently called Eranad region was originally under the Kingdom of Valluvanad before the conquest of Zamorin of Calicut. In early medieval period, Valluvakonathiri conquered a larger portion of Nedunganad (Pattambi-Ottapalam-Shoranur-Cherpulassery area), which was under the rule of Nedungathirippad. However Nedunganad was annexed by the Zamorin of Calicut in 15th century CE. The Nedumpuram Palace near Thiruvalla belongs to Valluvanad Royal family.

The chiefdom was disestablished in 1793 with the British East India Company taking over its management directly, and the hereditary ruling family settling for a pension arrangement.

Variations of the name 

 Valluvanad - Valluvanadu - Valluvanatu - Valluvanat - Walluvanad - Walluvanatu.
 Swaroopam (Svarupam) - Arangottu (Aarangottu)
 Vellattiri - Vellatiri - Velatra - Velnatera

Official names 

 Official name of the kingdom - the Kingdom of Vellattiri
 Official title of the Raja - Vallabha Raja (in the treaty with English)

Sanskrit name 
 Vallabhakshoni

Hereditary title 

 Rajasekhara (or Rayaran/Irayira Chekaran or Irayiravar)
 Rajasekhara and his son Vellan Kumaran (inscription)
Irayaran Chattan, the utaiyavar of Valluvanatu, in Jewish Copper Plates (1000 CE)

Headquarters 
The headquarters of Valluvanad was Angadipuram, a suburb of present day Perinthalmanna, which is now famous for its Thirumandhamkunnu Temple. The guardian deity of the Valluvanad royal family was Thirumandhamkunnu Bhagavati at Thirumandhamkunnu Temple .

Family origin 
The house/dynasty that had hereditary control over the region (in the north) was known as the Arangottu Swaroopam, possibly because the original home of the family was at Arangode (Arangottukara) along Bharathappuzha river near present-day Shoranur . Another possible location for the original home of the family is in the present Kuruva-Makkaraparamba area. There is an Arangottu Siva temple as well there. Kuruva was a part of Valluvanad kingdom while Arangottukara was a part of Nedunganad kingdom. Kuruva is situated near Mankada, where the Kovilakam of Valluvanad royal family known as Mankada Kovilakam exists. Kadampuzha, and Tirunavaya are also located near Kuruva.

History

An entity in south Kerala 
The Huzur Office Copper Plates (865 CE) (also known as the Parthivapuram plates) mention Valluvanad as a region within the Ay kingdom. Eraniel in Kanyakumari district, Tamil Nadu is also stated as being within this region. The plates refer to Karunandadakan (having the title of "Sree Vallabhan") and the establishment of the temple at Parthivasekharapuram (Shri Parthasarathy Temple at Parthivapuram in the Kanyakumari district).

Inscriptions at the Shiva temple at Thiruvotriyur (late 10th century) describing the life of Vellan Kumaran states that he is from a place called "Nandikkarai Puttur" (present-day Thirunandikkara), and is the son of the Valluvanad chieftain ('valabha rashtra natha') Rajasekhara. Vellan Kumaran is described as a commander in the Chola army in the famous Battle of Takkolam (948-49 CE) and considered a close confidante of Chola prince Rajaditya.

A district in Central Kerala within the Chera Perumal kingdom 
Valluvanad was one of the chiefdoms within the kingdom of the Chera Perumals (until the 12th century). The chieftain of Valluvanad, the nadu-udayavar, claimed authority through kinship and descent. The Hundred, the military organisation of the chiefdom, was the "aru-nurruvar" (the Six Hundred). The Vellattiri chieftain (the udayavar) initially exercised suzerain rights over a large portion of central Kerala. A 10th century Chera inscription from Irinjalakuda temple, declaring its protection by the Six Hundred of Valluvanad, shows either the southern extent of the border (or influence) of the chiefdom.

Some scholars state that the Valluvanad in northern Kerala, ruled by hereditary chieftains, was possibly organised in the beginning of the 10th century with a chieftain or general from Valluvanad in the south Kerala nominated as hereditary chieftain so that the name of Valluvanad was also transplanted there.

Rayiran Chathan, the chieftain (the udayavar) of Valluvanad, is mentioned as a witness in the Jewish copper plates of Cochin issued by the Chera Perumal.

Other references to Valluvanad

 Irayira Chekaran of Valluvanad was involved in a temple resolution to take over the village of Taviranur and bring it under the village of Sukapuram (Edappal) (inscription).
 Irayiravar, the Valluvanad chief, is seen in three temple transaction-related inscriptions from Avattiputhur/Avittathur (near Kodungallur) - an example of the chief performing regulatory functions outside his chiefdom.
 When a market centre was established at Irinjalakkuda (namely "Bhaskarapuram"), the protection of the area was given to the "aru-nurruvar" of Valluvanad (inscription dated to the close of the 10th century). - an example of the Hundred Organisation performing regulatory functions outside the chiefdom.

Independent chiefdom 

With the fall of the Chera Perumal kingdom around the 12th century, the various autonomous chiefdoms became independent. A Valluvanad ruler is mentioned as a witness in the Viraraghava Copper Plates from 1225.

The Brahmins of Sukapuram were supporters of Valluvanad.

Zamorin's encroachments 
After the fall of Chera Perumal kingdom in the 12th century, the right to preside over the Tirunavaya Mamankam festival (as the 'Rakshapurusha') passed on to the Vellattiri (according to local traditions). When the zamorin (the samoothiri) of Calicut became a major force in Kerala, they made inroads into Valluvanad and even usurped the right to preside over the Mamankam . The zamorin eventually extended his kingdom as east as Nilambur and as deep as Venkattakota (now called Kottakkal) .

Ever since, the Vellattiri used to send groups of suicide warriors (known as the Chavers) to kill the king of Calicut during the Mamankam and the Thaippuyam festivals and recover the long-lost right.

According to historians, "... the caver of Valluvanatu died fighting to avenge the death or defeat of their master and died fighting regularly at Tirunavaya for a long period. It means that the caver died fighting at Tirunavaya even after many generations. Thus it takes the form of blood feud ..."

Notes from historian K. V. Krishna Ayyar

 Brahmin Raja of Tirumanasseri ceded Ponnani to the zamorin as the price for his protection from Valluvanad and Perumpatappu (Cochin) .
Tradition says that the zamorin, despair for success at Tirunavaya, sought divine help by propitiating the Tirumandhamkunnu Bhagavati .
Malappuram, on the road between Calicut and Vellattiri's headquarters, was entrusted by the zamorin a member of Varakkal Paranampi's family (Malappuram Paranampi) . Nilambur was placed under Taccharakkavu Eralan, and Vallappanattukara under Tarakkal Eroma Menon (the commander of Chunganad) and Manjeri under the Karanappad .
Kariyur Mussad (the Brahmin minister and general of Vellattiri) was captured and put to death at Pataparamba and his lands (the Tens Kalams and Pantalur) were occupied .

Mysore's Invasion 
The country marked as "Valluvanad Proper" in the Company records was the sole remaining territory under the control of the Valluvanad "Raja" (chieftain) at the time of the Mysorean invasion of Kerala. The chieftain and his family fled to Travancore.

 According to the ancient laws of Kerala, many Nair chiefs and Nairs were liable to follow the Valluvanad chieftain in battles. These chiefs were allowed hold their land without paying revenue or tribute to the chieftain. Mysore rulers destroyed this custom.
 Grants were made of the lands to the temples, and to the Brahmins, all which lands were by the sultans brought to account in the revenue (the lands were taken from the Brahmins)

At the time of the Mysore conquest the following amsams (of the 1887 Valluvanad and Ernad taluks, the Valluvanad Proper) remained to Vellattiri

Angadipuram
Perinthalmanna
Melattur
Keezhattur
Pallippuram
Mankada
Arakkuparamba
chettanallur
Puzhakkattiri
Valambur
Karyavattam
Nenmini
Kodur
Pang
Kolathur
Kuruvambalam
Pulamanthole
Elamkulam
Vettattur
Kottopadam
Arakurissi
Tachampara
Anamangad
Paral
Chembrasseri
Pandikkad

The following regions (known as Valluvanad-zamorin) were controlled the zamorin of Calicut ("latest acquisition" by zamorin from Vellattiri)

Tuvvur
Thiruvizhamkunnu
Thenkara
Kumaramputhur
Karimpuzha
Thachanattukara
Aliparamba

Takeover by the English East India Company

By the treaty of Seringapatam (1792), Tipu Sultan ceded half of his territories, including Malabar, to the English East India Company.
The Valluvanad Raja, back from exile in Travancore (where the family was since c. 1788), requested the holding of the territories he laid claim to ("Millattoor, Angarypooram, Vanarcaddo, Kaapil"; and "the three districts of Congaad, Manoor and Edratura formerly belonging to Palgautcherry") as a manager for the company. This was granted as per the agreement, valid for one year, between the Raja (or through his representative Kariat Moosa) and company representatives William G. Farmer Esq. and Major Alexander Dow, concluded at Kozhikode on 30 July 1792.
The Raja undertook to pay a sum of Rs. 38,410.20 to the company within the year (later increased to Rs. 41,594.20). The agreement also mandated revenue collection from all minor landholders who, prior to Tipu's rule, only contributed to war efforts. The agreement, in essence, sought to continue revenue collection as per the reforms Tipu had made. Appointment of ministers or other employees in government, or employees engaged in revenue collection, had to be with the consent of the company. The agreement also stipulated that only the company's merchants had the right to procure pepper grown in Valluvanad. A detachment of sepoys would also be stationed at Angadipuram.

In May 1793 the Joint Commissioners dismissed the Raja and assumed direct management of the country. Inability to preserve the peace of the district (primarily owing to Mappila uprisings prevalent in the region) and shortfall in revenue collections were cited as the main reasons. Dispute over the management of the three districts formerly belonging to Palgautcherry (Palakkad) had led to the withdrawal of Raja's authority of those districts even earlier.
A pension agreement was then settled on between the Raja and the company.

State Details
Some details and characteristics of Valluvanad kingdom/principality (northern).

Branches (Tavalis) 

Tavalis in the senior lineage of Valluvanad - the House of Arangottu
Aripra tavali
Mankata tavali
Katannamanna tavali
Ayiranali tavali
Junior lineage of Valluvanad - the Vallotis (Vellodis)

Royal titles (Sthanis) 
The eldest five male  (the designates), in order of seniority (eldest male member in the matrilineal system), were titled as:

 Valluvakkonathiri –  eldest  and supreme leader
 Vellalpad
 Thacharalpad
 Edathralpad
 Kolathur Thampuran
 Padinjarekkara Thampuran –  nominated by Vellattiri (the  had rights over some landed property and privileges).

all five were eligible for

Thampurattis 

 Kulathur Thampuratti – the eldest  of the family 
 Kadanna Mootha Thampuratti – the next eldest 

Apart from this, the eldest female members of each  have their own rights and privileges.

Government

 Karuvayoor Moosad – the Brahmin chief minister of Vellattiri.
 Kunnathattil Madambil Nair (Mannarghat Nair) – the chieftain who looked after the affairs of the eastern boundary and hilly areas of Vellattiri. 
 Chondathil Mannadiar (Puthumana Panicker) 
 Nair of Kavada 
 Other dignitaries consisted of 14 , which included 
 Two Namboothiris
 Two persons of the royal house
 Four Panickers
 Elampulakkad Achan
 Kulathur Warrier
 Uppamkalathil Pisharody
 Pathiramanna Vellodi
 Parakkatt Nair
 Kakkoott Nair
 Mannarmala Nair
Kongad Nair
Naduvakkat Nair
 Cherukara Pisharody

Valluvanad Taluk under British Rule

The Amsoms included in Walluvanad Taluk was classified into four divisions- Vellatiri (Walluvanad proper), Walluvanad, Nedunganad, and Kavalappara. There were 64 Amsoms in the Taluk. The Taluk was created in 1860–61. Until 1860's Nedunganad (Pattambi-Ottapalam-Cherpulassery are south of River Thuthapuzha), which was the original land of Nedungathirippad, was a separate Taluk, and was considered as the ruling area of the Zamorin of Calicut. Nedunganad was added to Valluvanad Taluk only in 1860's. Valluvanad Taluk was one of the two Taluk added in the Malappuram Revenue Division of Malabar District. The other Taluk in Malappuram Division was Eranad.

1. Vellatiri (Walluvanad Proper)

Vellatiri (Walluvanad Proper) was the sole remaining territory of the Walluvanad Raja (Valluvakonathiri), who had once ruled majority of the South Malabar. A major part of Ernad Taluk was under Walluvanad before the expansion of the Ernad in 13th-14th centuries. Some of the Amsoms in this division was part of the Ernad Taluk. It consisted of the following 26 Amsoms: 

 Kodur
 Kuruva
 Mankada-Pallipuram
 Mankada
 Valambur
 Karyavattam
 Nenmini
 Melattur
 Vettattur
 Kottoppadam
 Arakurissi
 Tachampara
 Arakkuparamba
 Chethallur
 Angadipuram
 Perinthalmanna
 Puzhakkattiri
 Pang
 Kolathur
 Kuruvambalam
 Pulamantol
 Elamkulam
 Anamangad
 Paral
 Chembrassery
 Pandikkad

2. Walluvanad

The Amsoms in this division was comparatively later acquisition by the Zamorin in the territory of the Walluvanad Raja.  It consisted of the following 7 Amsoms:

 Tuvvur
 Thiruvizhamkunnu
 Thenkara
 Kumaramputhur
 Karimpuzha
 Thachchanattukara
 Aliparamba

3. Nedunganad

Nedunganad had been under the Zamorin for some time. After the disintegration of Perumals of Mahodayapuram, Nedunganad became independent. It was ruled by Nedungadis. Later it came under the Zamorin's kingdom. It consisted of the following 27 Amsoms:

 Elambulassery
 Vellinezhi
 Sreekrishnapuram
 Kadampazhipuram
 Kalladikode
 Vadakkumpuram
 Moothedath Madamba
 Thrikkadeeri
 Chalavara
 Cherpulassery
 Naduvattam-Karalmanna
 Kulukkallur
 Chundambatta
 Vilayur
 Pulasseri
 Naduvattam
 Muthuthala
 Perumudiyoor
 Nethirimangalam
 Pallippuram
 Kalladipatta
 Vallapuzha
 Kothakurssi
 Eledath Madamba
 Chunangad
 Mulanjur
 Perur

4. Kavalappara

Kavalappara had its own Nairs, who owed a sort of nominal allegiance both to the Zamorin of Calicut and the Kingdom of Cochin.  It consisted of the following 6 Amsoms:

 Mundakkottukurissi
 Panamanna
 Koonathara
 Karakkad
 Kuzhappalli
 Mundamuka

See also
 Vettathunadu
 Ponnani
 Zamorin of Calicut

External links
Valluvanad Vamsam

Sources

History of Malappuram district
Feudal states of Kerala